In American English, the phrase "Bye, Felicia" (actually spelled "Felisha" in the cast listing) is an informal phrase intended as a dismissive send-off, where the recipient is rendered so unimportant their name is reduced to "Felicia." The phrase originally comes from a scene from Angela Means' character Felicia in the American comedy film Friday (1995). According to Ice Cube, who starred in the film and co-wrote its script, "Bye, Felicia" is "the phrase 'to get anyone out of your face.

In popular culture

In 2009, the phrase entered the lexicon of RuPaul's Drag Race, an American reality competition television series. However, People wrote: "[E]ven that wouldn't necessarily account for the phrase extending beyond the cultures that would watch either Friday, Drag Race or both." Furthermore, the magazine said of the phrase: "So when your square friend uses it, take a little bit of pleasure in knowing they're referencing a stoner comedy – or a drag reality show referencing a stoner comedy – even if they have no idea." 

In 2014, VH1 began airing a television show called Bye Felicia, and American R&B-pop singer Jordin Sparks released a mixtape titled #ByeFelicia. According to Google Trends, the phrase reached its highest usage in mid-2015.

In the movie Straight Outta Compton (2015), Ice Cube (played by his son, O'Shea Jackson Jr.) said, "Bye, Felicia!", when throwing a girl named Felicia out of his hotel room. Naming the girl Felicia was not an intentional reference to Friday, but when Jackson ad-libbed the line as a "coincidental joke", the filmmakers decided to keep it in the film.

On December 14, 2017, one of ABC TV's Good Morning America hosts, Robin Roberts, used the phrase to conclude a segment about Omarosa Manigault Newman's departure from the Trump administration staff.

On December 19, 2018, former First Lady Michelle Obama used the phrase on The Tonight Show Starring Jimmy Fallon when describing leaving the White House.

See also 

 Bye Felipe

References

Bibliography
 
 
 

 

1995 neologisms
Comedy catchphrases
Friday (franchise)
Ice Cube
Quotations from film